Pseudatteria volcanica is a species of moth of the family Tortricidae. It is found in Mexico, Panama, Costa Rica, Colombia and Peru.

References

Moths described in 1872
Pseudatteria